Mount St. Mary High School is a private, Roman Catholic co-educational high school in Oklahoma City, Oklahoma, United States. It was established in 1903 by the Sisters of Mercy and located in the Roman Catholic Archdiocese of Oklahoma City.

History 
The original school was founded by 5 Sisters of Mercy in Shawnee, what was known at the time as Indian Territory. They relocated the school of Oklahoma City in 1903 as the original school had been destroyed in a fire two years earlier. It started as a school for girls, boarding at first, followed by day students.

In 1950 as a result of the reorganization of Catholic schools throughout the Oklahoma City archdiocese it was agreed that boys would be admitted as well as girls.

Notable alumni 
 Michael Brooks-Jimenez, lawyer and state senator

Notable staff 
 Joe Bowden, NFL linebacker
 Kellen McCoy, basketball player and coach

References

External links 
 

Schools in Oklahoma City
Roman Catholic Archdiocese of Oklahoma City
Catholic secondary schools in Oklahoma
Private high schools in Oklahoma
Educational institutions established in 1903
1903 establishments in Oklahoma Territory